The Navy of the Ukrainian People's Republic, was a marine military force of the Ukrainian People's Republic that was based on a free will of Imperial Russia sailors to pledge allegiance to Ukraine. The force was never fully operational as the country constantly fought for its survival with the neighboring Soviet Russia. Eventually most of the Black Fleet was either sunk by the Bolsheviks or become part of expeditionary force of the White movement on evacuation.

History

Early history

The first naval activities in the area now known as Ukraine date back to the late Middle Ages, when Zaporizhian Host Cossacks conducted raids in the Lower Dnieper, Southern Buh rivers and the Black Sea against Ottoman Empire. Cossacks were using chaikas (чайка)- light vessels propelled by sail and rowing, and armed with light hand held cannons. By a simple but genius technology, chaika could be transformed into a makeshift shallow-waters submarine used for reconnaissance and surprise landings. Due to the fact that the Zaporizhian Host had no direct access to the Black Sea those boats were light enough and small enough to navigate them through the rapids-filled Dnieper river. Nonetheless cossack's sea raids delivered huge blows to Ottoman coast cities, including capital port city of Constantinople/Istanbul as well as Samsun and Sinop (utmost northern port of Asia Minor). One of the most notorious naval commanders was Petro Konashevych-Sahaidachny. However, Cossacks never established permanent sea ports due to lack of various tactical and financial means.

1917–1921

During 1917 Russian Revolution, several ships of the Russian Imperial Navy's Black Sea Fleet, commanded and crewed by ethnic Ukrainians, declared themselves the Navy of the newly autonomous Ukrainian People's Republic Black Sea Fleet commander Mikhail Sablin raised the colours of the Ukrainian National Republic on 29 April 1918. However, few further steps on establishing a navy were made as the Ukrainian government lost control over coastal territories.

After the Revolution 1917, a time of anarchy and demoralization overtook the former Russian Black Sea Fleet. The Fleet, stationed in Sevastopol, was commanded by a collective, "Tsentroflot". Different political influences clashed: Ukrainian, Bolshevik, Menshevik, Social Revolutionaries and Anarchist. Very different flags were hoisted over ships: Ukrainian bicolors, old Russian ensigns, Bolshevist red flags and Anarchist black flags. They were hoisted and lowered even several times daily, according to changes of each crew's political orientation. The Ukrainian People's Republic aspired to take control of the Fleet. On 22 December 1917 the Naval Ministry in Kyiv was established.

Starting October 1917 the crews of the ships established military councils; the blue-yellow flags were flying from the masts. The ships Zavidniy (Enviable) and Russian cruiser Pamiat Merkuria (1907) were the first examples. The General Secretariat for Naval Affairs was established within the government of the Central Rada in Kyiv (in January 1918 it was reformed in a Ministry). The head of it became D. Antonovich. The Main Navy Staff was led by Captain Jerzy Świrski. For the educational and agitational purposes of the seamen the Central Rada seconded the commissars to Odessa, Nikolayev, Kherson and Sevastopol. November 22, 1917 the whole crew of the newest and most powerful warship of the Black Sea Fleet Volya swore fealty to the Central Rada, followed soon by several ships and submarines. On 29 April 1918, Rear-admiral M. Sablin was appointed commander-in-chief of the Ukrainian Navy. A telegram to Kyiv was sent from the staff ship Georgiy Pobedonosets “Effective today the Sevastopol fortress and the Fleet in Sevastopol raised the Ukrainian flag. Admiral Sablin assumed the command of the Fleet”. Having no reply the admiral ordered to repeat the telegram beginning with the words “Comrades of Kyiv Central Rada...”. But Sablin was unaware that at that moment the Central Rada in Kyiv was already history.

Ukraine had a navy for five months. From October 1917 till March 1918 the following came to be at the disposal of the Ukrainians: nine battleships, seven cruisers, 18 destroyers, 14 submarines, 16 patrol ships and avisos, 11 military transports and mother ships. Additionally, the Fleet’s Headquarters, all military institutions and plants, all coastal fortifications were in hands of the Ukrainians. But they were yet to face a disaster.

The Kaiser’s forces had been advancing on Sevastopol with a goal to capture the Black Sea Fleet. Having no support from the land forces, Admiral Sablin was forced enter negotiations regarding cessation of hostilities. The Germans however rejected the armistice proposals and the advance continued.

In April 1918 German and Ukrainian troops invaded Crimea. On 29 April 1918, fleet-commanding Rear-admiral Sablin (Russian) gave an order to hoist Ukrainian national flags over all ships in Sevastopol (the medal to the right commemorates that event). But Germans started to occupy Sevastopol, because the bolsheviks began to lead away ships. Centroflot (the combined fleet revolutionary committee), in order to save the Fleet, took a decision to move it to Novorossiysk. But on April 30, 1918, only the small part of the fleet under command of Admiral Sablin, which trusted the bolsheviks, headed for Novorossiysk and hoisted Russian St. Andrew (saltire) ensigns. The greater part of the Ukrainian fleet remained in Sevastopol - there were 30 destroyers and torpedo boats, 25 auxiliaries, 7 battleships and small craft as well as 15 submarines left in Sevastopol under Admiral Myhaylo Ostrogradskiy who in this situation assumed command.

On 1 May 1918 Germans captured the ships remaining in Sevastopol, because the actions of Bolsheviks violated the peace agreement. On 17 June 1918, 1 dreadnought and 6 destroyers returned from Novorossiysk to Sevastopol, where they were also captured. The greater part of the ships remaining in Novorossiysk were destroyed by their own crews on Lenin's command. In July–November 1918 Germans gradually transferred many ships to the command of Ukrainian government (Hetman Pavlo Skoropadskyi). The main Ukrainian sea power concentrated in Odessa and Nikolayev was more than 20 minesweepers, 7 small cruisers, 1 dreadnought and more than 30 auxiliaries. In Sevastopol there were only 2 old battleships under Ukrainian flags. On 18 July 1918 the Naval Ministry in Kyiv established new naval ensigns and some rank flags (e.g. flag of Naval Minister, flag of Deputy Minister). The old Russian jack remained as Ukrainian naval jack. It was regarded as symbol of glory of Black Sea Fleet, whose crews were in large part previously Ukrainian. On 17 September Germans gives Ukraine 17 U-boats. In December 1918, when naval forces of the Entente were approaching Sevastopol, Ukrainian Rear-admiral V. Klokhkovskyy (В'ячеслав Клочковський) commanded all ships to hoist Russian St. Andrew (saltire) ensigns. It was a demonstration of good intentions for the Entente. However, the Entente captured the Black Sea Fleet and subsequently transferred it to the Russian "White" forces. In Ukrainian hands remained only small in numbers subdivisions of marines. Ukrainian naval authorities existed until 1921.

List of Ukrainian ships

On October 17, 1917 the 2nd rank Captain Ye.Akimov was appointed the representative of the Central Council of Ukraine at the command of the Black Sea Fleet. In November 1917 in Sevastopol was established the Sahaidachny Sea Battalion (kurin) which on November 24, 1917 was sent to Kyiv to extinguish Bolshevik uprisings and participated in the Kyiv Arsenal January Uprising.

On December 29, 1917 most of the Black Sea Fleet was taken over by Bolsheviks.

Earlier in December 1917 the Black Seas Fleet squadron under Ukrainian flags led by the Russian battleship Imperator Aleksandr III and included another cruiser and three destroyers participated in the evacuation of the 127th Infantry Division from Trebizond back to Ukraine.

Baltic Fleet
 Soviet cruiser Krasnyi Krym (October 12, 1917)
 Russian destroyer Ukraina (October 12, 1917)
 Russian destroyer Haidamak (October 12, 1917)

Black Sea Fleet
 Russian battleship Georgii Pobedonosets (November 9, 1917)
 Russian cruiser Pamiat Merkuria (1907) (November 12, 1917)
 Russian destroyer Zorkiy (November 12, 1917)
 Russian destroyer Zvonkiy (November 12, 1917)
 Russian Battleship Volya (previously Imperator Aleksandr III) (November 22, 1917)
 Russian battleship Imperatritsa Ekaterina Velikaya

Legacy
On 29 April 2018 Ukrainian President Petro Poroshenko and Prime Minister Volodymyr Groysman greeted Ukrainian Navy personnel on the 100th anniversary since the foundation of Ukraine's Navy. The  Black Sea Fleet raised the colours of the Ukrainian National Republic on 29 April 1918.

See also
 Ukrainian Navy, Soviet inheritance

References

External links
 Ukrainian Navy: ferial excursions into the past and present
 Hetman government
 Black Sea Fleet of Ukraine
 Black Sea Fleet in the period of the Central Council, Hetmanate and Directorate
 Death of fleet
 Strengthening the system of naval education in the epoch of Ukrainian revolution of 1917-1921
 Navy policy of the Central Council
 Ministry of Naval Affairs of Ukraine
 Ukrainian Marine Infantry: history of establishment
 Creation of administration in the epoch of the Hetman
 Mykhailo Ivanovych Bilynsky — Naval Minister of the Ukrainian People's Republic
 Ukrainisation as an important part of building a fleet in the epoch of Central Council
 Ships of Ukrainian Fleet (1917-18)
 90th Anniversary of the Ukrainian Navy!
 Ukrainian Marine Infantry 1917-20
 Historical flags
 Historical flags
 Historical flags
 Fleet in the epoch of Central Council
 In 1918 Black Sea Fleet raised the Ukrainian flag twice
 Raising of Ukrainian flags by the Black Sea fleet was not an accident
 Victorious march of the Ukrainian Army into Crimea
 Black Sea Fleet and Ukrainian State development 1917-18

Military history of Ukraine
Disbanded navies
Military units and formations established in 1917
Ukrainian People's Republic